Temjen Imna Along (born 25 November 1980) is an Indian politician and the State President of the Bharatiya Janata Party of Nagaland since 15 January 2020. He is a  Member of the Legislative Assembly in the Nagaland Legislative Assembly from Alongtaki constituency since 2018. He is also the Minister of Higher and Technical Education in the Fourth Neiphiu Rio ministry since 2018.

In Popular Culture 
He is very active in social media and also very popular due to his humor. He also posts about his state and promotes the culture of Nagaland.

References 

Living people
Bharatiya Janata Party politicians from Nagaland
Nagaland MLAs 2018–2023
Year of birth missing (living people)
People from Mokokchung district